Levanger Hospital is a hospital located in the town of Levanger in the municipality of Levanger in Trøndelag county, Norway.  The hospital is located along the road Kirkegata on the west side of the town of Levanger.

Along with Namsos Hospital, this is one of two hospitals in the old Nord-Trøndelag county (now part of Trøndelag county).  Both hospitals are managed by the Nord-Trøndelag Hospital Trust. Levanger Hospital generally serves the southern and central parts of northern Trøndelag county.

History
The decision to build the hospital was made in 1840, and it was opened in 1844. On 1 April 1844, Peter Wilhelm Kreidahl Dietrichson was appointed as the chief physician of the hospital. Former names for the hospital are Nordre Trondhjems Amts Sygehus på Eidesøren (North Trondheim county's hospital at Eidesøren) and Innherred sykehus, the latter name was used until 2002.

References

Hospital buildings completed in 1844
Hospitals in Norway
Levanger
Hospitals established in 1844
1844 establishments in Norway
Trøndelag County Municipality